The 1957 European Amateur Boxing Championships  were held in Prague, Czechoslovakia, from May 25 to June 2. The 12th edition of the bi-annual competition was organised by the European governing body for amateur boxing, EABA. There were 149 fighters from 21 countries participating.

Medal winners

Medal table

External links
Amateur Boxing

European Amateur Boxing Championships
Boxing
European Amateur Boxing Championships
Boxing
May 1957 sports events in Europe
June 1957 sports events in Europe
Sports competitions in Prague
1950s in Prague